Ctenophorus maculatus, commonly known as the spotted military dragon, spotted dragon, or spotted sand-dragon is a species of agamid lizard occurring in semi-arid to arid shrublands and hummock grasslands of Western Australia and a small part of South Australia.

References

Agamid lizards of Australia
maculatus
Endemic fauna of Australia
Reptiles described in 1831
Taxa named by John Edward Gray